Jerzy Kowalski (born 23 February 1988) is a Polish rower. He competed in the 2020 Summer Olympics.

References

1988 births
Living people
Sportspeople from Toruń
Rowers at the 2020 Summer Olympics
Polish male rowers
Olympic rowers of Poland